Yingde hongcha (pronounced ) is a black tea from Yingde, Guangdong province, China. First produced mechanically in 1959. Much of the tea is exported. Some quality varieties are produced, which often look like leaf Oolong.

The tea should have a cocoa-like aroma and, like most Chinese black teas, a sweet aftertaste.

Chinese tea grown in Guangdong
Chinese teas
Black tea